SSV Dornbirn Schoren is a women's handball club from Dornbirn in Austria. UHC Stockerau competes in the Women Handball Liga Austria.

European record

Team

Current squad 

Squad for the 2019-20 season

Goalkeepers
 44 ANJELA ROGANOVIC
 1 KATJA RAUTER

Wingers
RW
 14 LEONIE GERBIS
 6 SARA KOJIC
LW 
 20 MARIE HUBER
 7 Sophie Ölz
Line Players 
 77 KATARINA GLADOVIC
 33 KIM GANDER

Back players
LB
 81 ADRIANA MARKSTEINER
 15 BEATRIX KERESTEĹY
 23 Julia Marksteiner
CB 
 18 FRANZISKA AMANN
RB
 17 NAOMI BENNEKER
 4 MALINA KELLENBERGER

External links
 Official website
 EHF Club profile

Austrian handball clubs